Harvest Storm is the third studio album by Altan, released in April 1992 on the Green Linnet label.

Track listing

All titles arranged by Altan.

 "Pretty Peg/New Ships A-Sailing/The Bird's Nest/The Man From Bundoran" (reels) – 3:37
 "Dónal Agus Mórag/The New-Rigged Ship" (song and reel) – 4:27
 "King of the Pipers" (jig) – 3:08
 "Séamus O'Shanahan's/Walking in Liffey Street" (jigs) – 2:33
 "Mo Choill" (song) – 4:10
 "The Snowy Path" (slip jig) – 2:12
 "Drowsy Maggie/Rakish Paddy/Harvest Storm" (reels) – 2:57
 "Sí Do Mhaimeo Í" (song) – 2:50
 "McFarley's/Mill Na Máidí" (reels) – 2:25
 "The Rosses Highlands" (highlands) – 2:58
 "A Nobleman's Wedding" (song) – 6:35
 "Bog An Lochain/Margaree Reel/The Humours of Westport" (strathspey and reels) – 3:34
 "Dobbin's Flowery Vale" (slow air and reel) – 4:20

All titles are traditional except the following:
"Séamus O'Shanahan's/Walking in Liffey Street" composed by Paul O'Shaughnessy
"The Snowy Path" composed by Mark Kelly
"Harvest Storm" composed by Frankie Kennedy and Mairéad Ní Mhaonaigh

"Mo Choill" ("My Love") is a song from a lady called "Rose of the songs" who had so many songs that she was known all over Ireland by a lot of people. It's a sad song about a man who goes off to sea and leaves his beloved one behind.

Live recordings
A live recording of the medley "Drowsie Maggie" performed by Altan in 1999 at the Cambridge Folk Festival is available on the Cambridge Folk Festival - A Celebration of Roots Music 1998-99 1-CD collective album. Released in 2000, this compilation includes a total of 17 live recordings from the Cambridge Folk Festivals 1998 & 1999.

Personnel

Altan
Mairéad Ní Mhaonaigh – Fiddle, vocals
Frankie Kennedy – Flute,  whistle, backing vocals 
Ciarán Tourish – Fiddle,  whistle, backing vocals 
Paul O'Shaughnessy – Fiddle
Ciarán Curran – Bouzouki,  bouzouki-guitar
Mark Kelly – Guitar, backing vocals 
Dáithí Sproule – Guitar on "The Rosses Highlands", backing vocals

Guest musicians
Frieda Gray – Dancing on "Mill na Máidí"
Tommy Hayes – Bodhrán, bass bodhrán, percussion, jaw harp
Dónal Lunny – Keyboards, bass bodhrán on "Dónal Agus Mórag"
Liam Ó Maonlaí – Didgeridoo on "Sí Do Mhaimeo Í"

Production
P.J. Curtis – Producer
Brian Masterson – Engineer 
Aidan McGovern – Assistant Engineer 
Ciaran Byrne – Assistant Engineer 
Greenberg Kingsley – Design
Ross Wilson – Artwork
Colm Henry – Photography

References

Altan (band) albums
1992 albums